is a 2012 Japanese anime film directed by Kōnosuke Uda.

Plot
On a hot summer day, a young boy named Yuta visits the dam where his father died one year ago. At the site he meets a mysterious old man. He gives the old man something to drink and later that day the old man saves him after slipping off the dam. He wakes up to discover he is 30 years in the past. There he meets a girl named Saeko, who loves fireflies, and also befriends a boy his age named Kenjo.

Voice cast
source:
 Akashi Takei as Yuta
 Ayumi Kimura as Saeko
 Osamu Nitta  as Kenzo
 Takahiro Sakurai as Yuta (adult)
 Mamiko Noto as Saeko (adult)
 Kazuya Nakai as Kenzo (adult)
 Chikao Ohtsuka as Aotengu
 Tarô Ishida as Hotaru Ji

References

External links
  
 

2012 films
2012 anime films
Japanese animated films
Toei Animation films
Films based on Japanese novels